is a public co-educational university in Fukuyama, Hiroshima, Japan. In April 2011 it was established by reorganizing Fukuyama City Junior College for Women (founded in 1963).

The university is located in a new campus (Minatomachi Campus) next to Fukuyama Port. The older campus (Kitahonjo Campus of the women's junior college) is used as sports facilities, since the new campus lacks them.

Organization 
The university has no graduate schools yet (as of October 2011).

Undergraduate schools 
 Faculty of Education
 Department of Childhood Education
 Faculty of Urban Management
 Department of Urban Management

References

External links 
  

Public universities in Japan
Universities and colleges in Hiroshima Prefecture